Jan-Peter Tewes (born 20 November 1968 in Mülheim an der Ruhr, Nordrhein-Westfalen) is a former field hockey defender from Germany, who won the gold medal with the Men's National Team at the 1992 Summer Olympics in Barcelona, Spain. His older brother Stefan (born  1967) was also on that winning side. Tewes also competed at the 1996 Summer Olympics in Atlanta, United States, where he finished 4th.

References
 databaseOlympics
 sports-reference

External links
 

1968 births
Living people
German male field hockey players
Male field hockey defenders
Field hockey players at the 1992 Summer Olympics
Field hockey players at the 1996 Summer Olympics
Olympic field hockey players of Germany
Olympic gold medalists for Germany
Place of birth missing (living people)
Olympic medalists in field hockey
Medalists at the 1992 Summer Olympics
1998 Men's Hockey World Cup players
Der Club an der Alster players
HTC Uhlenhorst Mülheim players
20th-century German people